The Volkswagen Group New Small Family platform (NSF) (also known as Typ AA or PQ12 platform) is a range of ultra-compact city cars manufactured by Volkswagen Group launched in late 2011, based on the Volkswagen up! concept cars shown at 2007's Frankfurt and Tokyo motor shows.  Although the up! concept car had a rear-engine design, the NSF's platform is front-engined, according to reports, in order to reduce investment costs.  The range will consist of a short wheelbase three-door hatchback and a five-door version.  A hybrid version could also join the range. 

The cars are built in Slovakia at the Group's Devínska Nová Ves plant near Bratislava, Volkswagen Group planned to invest 308 million Euros (about $398.56 million) in readying the plant for the project.  NSF models will be badged as Volkswagens, SEATs and Škodas,  It has also been reported that  Audi is planning a version of the NSF, tentatively named E1, with a distinctively-styled body and interior.

Volkswagen Group expects to build 4.5 million NSF cars in the model's anticipated nine-year life.

NSF-based models

Current
Volkswagen up!
SEAT Mii
Škoda Citigo

Cancelled 

 Volkswagen Taigun (2016)

See also
 Volkswagen Group MQB platform
 Volkswagen Group MLB platform
 Volkswagen Group MSB platform
 Volkswagen Group MEB platform
 List of Volkswagen Group platforms

References

External links
Winding Road article on New Small Family

New Small Family